Diecai District is a district of the city of Guilin, Guangxi, China.

There are 2 subdistricts and 1 township in Diecai District:

 Diecai Subdistrict
 Beimen Subdistrict
 Dahe Township

References

County-level divisions of Guangxi
Administrative divisions of Guilin